Gilbert Austin (first ¼ 1895 – first ¼ 1948) was an English professional rugby league footballer who played in the 1910s and 1920s.

Background
Gilbert Austin's birth was registered in Sculcoates district, Hull, East Riding of Yorkshire, England, he lived in First Lane, Northfield, Hessle , he died from injuries sustained in a traffic collision, when a taxi that he, his wife (also seriously injured) and another four people (of which one woman was also seriously injured) were travelling in, was in collision with a truck near Ferriby, East Riding of Yorkshire, England, and his death aged 53 was registered in Hull district, East Riding of Yorkshire, England.

Playing career

International honours
Gilbert Austin played  for "The Reds" in the 15–38 defeat by "The Whites" in a trial match for the 1924 Great Britain Lions tour of Australia and New Zealand trial match at Central Park, Wigan on Wednesday 20 February 1924, in front of a crowd of 15,000, but ultimately he was not selected for Great Britain.

County honours
Gilbert Austin played for Yorkshire while at Hull Kingston Rovers; he played  in the 5–6 defeat by Lancashire in the 1923–24 County Championship match during the 1923–24 season at Watersheddings, Oldham on Saturday 8 December 1923, he played  in the 0–20 defeat by Cumberland in the 1924–25 County Championship match during the 1924–25 season at the Recreation Ground, Whitehaven on Saturday 18 October 1924. he played  in the 9–28 defeat by Lancashire in the 1924–25 County Championship match during the 1924–25 season at Thrum Hall, Halifax on Saturday 29 November 1924. and he played  in the 10–26 defeat by Lancashire in the 1925–26 County Championship match during the 1925–26 season at City Road (the then home ground of St. Helens Recs), St. Helens on Saturday 12 December 1925.

Challenge Cup Final appearances
Gilbert Austin played , i.e. number 5, in the Hull Kingston Rovers' 3–16 defeat by Oldham in the 1924–25 Challenge Cup Final during the 1924–25 season at Headingley Rugby Stadium, Leeds on Saturday 25 April 1925, in front of a crowd of 28,335.

Club career
Gilbert Austin made his début (as did Frank Bielby) for Hull Kingston Rovers, and scored a try in the 22–10 victory over Wakefield Trinity at Craven Street, Kingston upon Hull Saturday 25 January 1919, he mainly played  in his first two seasons of 1918–19 season and 1919–20 season, mainly playing  in the 1920–21 season and 1921–22 season, and mainly playing  from the 1922–23 season onwards, he scored 37-tries in the 1924–25 season, including 6-tries against Halifax in the RFL Yorkshire Cup, he was described as being ‘not blessed with either pace or tremendous strength, he was an extremely dedicated and reliable all-rounder who knew his way to the try-line and who never gave less than his best’, he scored his last try for Hull Kingston Rovers against St. Helens Recs on Sunday 1 January 1928, he played his last match for Hull Kingston Rovers in the 0–0 draw with Dewsbury at Craven Street, Kingston upon Hull on Saturday 7 January 1928, and he was transferred from Hull Kingston Rovers to York during early October 1928.

Testimonial match
A joint benefit season/testimonial match at Hull Kingston Rovers during the 1927–28 season was shared by; Gilbert Austin and Frank Bielby, during May 1928 each player received £81 9s 7d (based on increases in average earnings, this would be approximately £25,480 in 2017).

Career records
Gilbert Austin previously held rugby league's "most consecutive matches played" record with 190-matches, from his début on Saturday 25 January 1919 to nearly 5-years later on Saturday 8 December 1923, when he played for Yorkshire against Lancashire, this record was subsequently extended to 239-matches (242?) by Keith Elwell.

Genealogical information
Gilbert Austin's marriage to Susanna S. (née Clark ( – death registered fourth ¼ 1928 aged 32 in Sculcoates district)) was registered during fourth ¼ 1918 in Sculcoates district. They had children; Edith E. Austin (birth registered during fourth ¼ 1920 in Sculcoates district), Joan Austin (birth registered during first ¼ 1924 in Sculcoates district), and Vera Austin (birth registered during third ¼ 1925 in Sculcoates district). Gilbert Austin's second marriage was to Ethel B. (née Candler, born ) was registered during fourth ¼ 1933 in Sculcoates district. They had children;  Pauline M. Austin (birth registered during third ¼ 1937 in Hull district), and Gilbert D. Austin (birth registered during fourth ¼ 1941 in Holderness district).

References

External links
Search for "Austin" at rugbyleagueproject.org
Search for "Gilbert Austin" at britishnewspaperarchive.co.uk

1895 births
1948 deaths
English rugby league players
Hull Kingston Rovers players
Rugby league centres
Rugby league fullbacks
Rugby league players from Kingston upon Hull
Rugby league wingers
York Wasps players
Yorkshire rugby league team players
Road incident deaths in England
Truck road incident deaths